Hussein Kamel (Arabic: حسين كامل) may refer to:

Hussein Kamel of Egypt (1853–1917), Sultan of Egypt
Hussein Kamel al-Majid (1954–1996), Iraqi general and son-in-law of Saddam Hussein

See also
Hussein Kamal (حسين كمال)